Alan Mackin is the name of:

Alan Mackin (footballer), Scottish footballer, father
Alan Mackin (tennis), Scottish tennis player, son